Dilara Bozan (born 28 March 1997) is a Turkish karateka. She is a two-time gold medalist in the women's individual kata event at the Islamic Solidarity Games. She is also an eight-time medalist in this event at the European Karate Championships.

Career 

She won the bronze medal in the women's kata event at the 2015 European Games held in Baku, Azerbaijan. She won the gold medal in the women's individual kata event at the 2017 Islamic Solidarity Games held in Baku, Azerbaijan.

At the 2018 European Karate Championships held in Novi Sad, Serbia, she won one of the bronze medals in both the individual and team kata events. In the same year, she also competed in the women's individual kata event at the 2018 World Karate Championships held in Madrid, Spain.

In 2019, she represented Turkey at the European Games in Minsk, Belarus and she won one of the bronze medals in the women's individual kata event. In 2019, she also competed in the women's individual kata event at the 2019 World Beach Games held in Doha, Qatar without winning a medal.

In 2021, she won the silver medal in her event at the European Karate Championships held in Poreč, Croatia. She qualified at the World Olympic Qualification Tournament in Paris, France to represent Turkey at the 2020 Summer Olympics in Tokyo, Japan.

She won the silver medal in the women's individual kata event at the 2022 European Karate Championships held in 
Gaziantep, Turkey. She won the gold medal in the women's individual kata event at the 2021 Islamic Solidarity Games held in Konya, Turkey.

Achievements

References

External links 

 

Living people
1997 births
Sportspeople from Iğdır
Turkish female karateka
European Games bronze medalists for Turkey
Karateka at the 2015 European Games
Karateka at the 2019 European Games
European Games medalists in karate
Islamic Solidarity Games medalists in karate
Islamic Solidarity Games competitors for Turkey
Karateka at the 2020 Summer Olympics
Olympic karateka of Turkey
21st-century Turkish sportswomen